Sultana bint Turki Al Sudairi (1940 – 30 July 2011) was a Saudi royal. She was the cousin and first wife of Prince Salman bin Abdulaziz. Three years after her death, Sultana's husband became king of Saudi Arabia.

Biography
Sultana was the daughter of Turki Al Sudairi who served as the governor of Asir province from the early days of Kingdom to 8 June 1969 and then was appointed governor of Jizan province. He was King Salman's maternal uncle.   

Sultana married Salman bin Abdulaziz in 1954. They had six children: Prince Fahd, Prince Sultan, Prince Ahmed, Prince Abdulaziz, Prince Faisal and Princess Hessa. The family lived in a palace near to the royal court.

She involved in philanthropic activities through the Prince Fahd bin Salman Charitable Society for the Care of Kidney Patients and other charitable organizations in Saudi Arabia and Pakistan. She founded Princess Sultana Foundation in May 1990. Its educational institution was established in 2000, and Princess Sultana University College for Women was established in 2001 which is a higher education institution for women in Islamabad, Pakistan.

Sultana bint Turki had a kidney ailment since early 1980s and frequently went abroad for treatment. She spent long periods of vacation at the Casa Riad palace, located on the Golden Mile in Marbella next to the palace of King Fahd's family. During her vacation in Marbella in 2011 she was treated at a private hospital there, but she was transferred in the mid-July from Malaga airport to Riyadh with an air ambulance plane when her condition became much worse. She died at age 71 in Riyadh on 30 July 2011. Funeral prayers for her were performed at Imam Turki bin Abdullah Mosque in Riyadh on 2 August.

References

Sultana
Sultana
1940 births
2011 deaths
Burials at Al Oud cemetery
Deaths from kidney disease
Sultana
Princesses by marriage